Zhou Heng (Pinyin: Zhōu Héng; born November 24, 1985 in Wuhan, Hubei) is a Chinese football player who currently plays as a midfielder or defender for Hainan Star.

Club career
Zhou Heng began his professional football career playing for the Wuhan Huanghelou youth team before moving up to the senior team in the 2005 league season when he made his league debut against Shenyang Ginde on July 6, 2005 in a 3-0 victory. The following seasons saw him steadily establish himself within the squad, however his development within the team was cut short after the sudden disbanding and relegation of Wuhan from the Chinese Super League after the club's management did not accept the punishment given to them by the Chinese Football Association after a scuffle broke out during a league game against Beijing Guoan on September 27, 2008. Still a young prospect with top tier experience he would join recently promoted side Chongqing Lifan for two million Yuan with teammate Wu Peng.

Joining Chongqing Lifan at the beginning of the 2009 league season Zhou would immediately command a regular place within the side and would even personally score his first league goal against Shandong Luneng on October 10, 2009 in a 1-1 draw. While he personally had a constructive season it was a disappointing campaign for Chongqing who finished at the bottom of the league.

In February 2015, Zhou transferred to fellow China League One side Xinjiang Tianshan Leopard.

In February 2019, Zhou transferred to League Two side Wuhan Three Towns. The following season he would go on to aid them in winning the division title and promotion into the second tier. This would be followed by another division title win and promotion as the club entered the top tier for the first tine in their history. After three seasons he would move to third tier club Hainan Star.

Career statistics 
Statistics accurate as of match played 31 January 2023.

Honours

Club
Wuhan Three Towns
China League One: 2021
China League Two: 2020

References

External links
 Player stats at sohu.com
 

1985 births
Living people
Footballers from Wuhan
Chinese footballers
Wuhan Guanggu players
Chongqing Liangjiang Athletic F.C. players
Wuhan F.C. players
Xinjiang Tianshan Leopard F.C. players
Chinese Super League players
China League One players
Association football midfielders